Eddie Bevan (c. 1925–1988) was a Canadian football player who played for the Hamilton Tiger-Cats. He won the Grey Cup with them in 1953. He previously served in World War II with the Royal Canadian Navy. After his football career, he was a firefighter and worked at a truck dealership. In 2012, he was named to the Hamilton Tiger-Cats All-Time Team. He died after an illness during the week of June 4, 1988.

References

1920s births
1988 deaths
Sportspeople from Hamilton, Ontario
Players of Canadian football from Ontario
Hamilton Tiger-Cats players
Canadian military personnel of World War II